Natascha Bruce is a British writer and translator of Chinese fiction and nonfiction. She currently resides in Amsterdam.

Biography 
Bruce graduated from the University of Cambridge in 2010 with a Bachelor's degree in Chinese, focusing on contemporary Chinese literature. She began working as a translator in Taiwan, translating subtitles and screenplays into English. In 2015, she was a joint winner with Michael Day of the inaugural Bai Meigui Translation Prize for her translation of Dorothy Tse's short story Chicken (鸡). In 2016 she was a recipient of the American Literary Translators Association's Emerging Translator Mentorship for a Singaporean language. Since then, she has translated a number of works by writers including Xu Xiaobin, Ho Sok Fong, Can Xue, Patigül, Xie Ding, and Yeng Pway Ngon. Her translation of Ho's short story collection Lake Like a Mirror was shortlisted for the Warwick Prize for Women in Translation in 2020.

Bruce's other translations of Tse's work have been published in numerous journals; in 2019 they were awarded the 2019 Academy of American Poets Poems in Translation Prize for Cloth Birds, an author and translator residency at the Leeds Centre for Chinese Writing in 2020. Bruce was awarded a PEN/Heim Translation Fund Grant for the publication of Tse's first novel, to be published by Fitzcarraldo Editions in 2023. Her translation of Can Xue's novella, Mystery Train, is forthcoming from Sublunary Editions in 2022.

Selected Bibliography 

 
 
 
 
Xu, Xiaobin (2021), A Classic Tragedy: Short Stories, London: Balestier Press, ISBN 9781911221289
Dorothy Tse (2023), Fitzcarraldo Editions/Graywolf Press, ISBN 9781804270349/ISBN 9781644452356

References 

Year of birth missing (living people)
Living people
Alumni of the University of Cambridge
Literary translators
21st-century British translators
Chinese–English translators